M. A. Bari is a Bangladesh Awami League politician and the former Member of Parliament of Sherpur-3.

Career
Bari was elected to parliament from Sherpur-3 as a Bangladesh Awami League candidate in 1996.

References

Awami League politicians
Living people
7th Jatiya Sangsad members
Year of birth missing (living people)